Macorna is a small community within the Shire of Gannawarra, Australia. There are only a couple of houses, but there is a football/netball club, cricket club, Landcare group, fire station and a pony club. The town is 85 metres above sea level.

Transport
The town is on the Yungera railway line and the railway reached Macorna in 1884. Macorna station closed in 1981.

Community
The town has an Australian Rules football team competing in the Golden Rivers Football League. Macorna was a founding member of the Kerang and District Football League in 1946, which was renamed the Golden Rivers Football League in 1998. Prior to World War II the club played in a number of local leagues, including the Tandarra-Macorna Line Football Association, Pyramid Hill Football League, Leagher Football Association, and Northern Districts Football League.

The Macorna Pony Club was formed in 2004,

References

External links
Gannawarra Shire Council - Official Website

Towns in Victoria (Australia)